Harm Dallmeyer (December 16, 1943 – April 11, 1983) was a German politician of the Christian Democratic Union (CDU) and former member of the German Bundestag.

Life 
Dallmeyer joined the CDU in 1971. He became local chairman in Schleswig and member of the district executive committee. From December 1976 to October 1980 he was Secretary General of the CDU Schleswig-Holstein.

From May 29, 1979, to November 3, 1980, he was a member of the state parliament in Schleswig-Holstein. He was a member of the Committee on Internal Affairs and Legal Affairs. He resigned his Landtag mandate after being elected to the Bundestag in 1980, of which he was a member from 4 November. He was elected via the state list of the Christian Democratic Union of Germany (CDU) in Schleswig-Holstein. He was a successful direct candidate in the 1983 Bundestag elections in the constituency of Flensburg - Schleswig and remained a member of the Bundestag until his death on 11 April 1983.

Literature

References

1942 births
1983 deaths
Members of the Bundestag for Schleswig-Holstein
Members of the Bundestag 1983–1987
Members of the Bundestag 1980–1983
Members of the Bundestag for the Christian Democratic Union of Germany
Members of the Landtag of Schleswig-Holstein